José Christian Chávez Garza (born August 7, 1983), most often known as Christian Chávez is a Mexican singer, songwriter and actor, best known for his role as Giovanni Méndez López in the telenovela Rebelde and its spin-off pop group RBD.

Career
In 2002, Chávez was cast as Fernando 'Fercho' Lucena in the telenovela Clase 406. The series had four seasons and 350 one-hour episodes in total.

In 2004, Chávez joined a new telenovela Rebelde as one of the lead characters, Juan "Giovanni" Méndez López, a mischievous and rebellious student at a private boarding school in Mexico. Chávez became widely known for his ever-changing hair colors.

The success of Rebelde launched RBD composed of Chávez, Anahí, Dulce María, Christopher von Uckermann, Maite Perroni, and Alfonso Herrera. The group made 9 studio albums, including records in Spanish, Portuguese and English. To date, they have sold over 20 million albums worldwide, and toured across Mexico, South America, Serbia, Romania, the United States, and Spain. On August 15, 2008, RBD released a message telling fans that they had decided to split up. They went on one final tour, Gira Del Adios World Tour which ended in 2008. To this day, RBD is considered the most successful pop group in Mexican history.

In June 2007, Chávez briefly appeared in the stage shows Hoy No Me Puedo Levantar, and in May 2008 he participated in Avenida Q (the Mexican version of Avenue Q), where he played the main puppet characters Eugenio (Princeton) and Rodrigo (Rod); his presence on the shows was intended to be one of the main box office attractions.

After RBD's breakup, Chávez launched his career as a solo recording artist. His first studio album, Almas Transparentes, peaked at number 56 on the Mexican pop charts.

In April 2011, Chávez released the provocative music video for his single "Libertad", featuring former co-star Anahí, which became an instant sensation on YouTube with more than 1,000,000 views within three days of its upload. The video featured Chávez in a church confessional telling a priest he was not sorry for his sexual preference; it featured a cameo by Perez Hilton. "The video looks super sexy", Hilton gushed on his blog. "It's inspired us to unleash our own LIBERTAD." "Libertad" continues to be an anthem for the gay youth throughout Latin America.

On August 14, 2012, Chávez released the highly anticipated album Esencial, an acoustic compilation of songs performed at his show in São Paulo, Brazil in January 2012. People en Español called the release of his single, Sacrilégio, "the return of Christian Chávez". A red carpet presentation of Esencial was held in Mexico City in June. Chávez performed duets with RBD co-star Maite Perroni and Mexican pop/rock singer Ana Victoria.

"Sacrilegio", a track on Esencial also released as a single, immediately landed in the top 10 on Mexican pop charts.  Other notable songs on the album include "No Me Olvides", written for Chávez by Mexican singer Juan Gabriel, and a remake of "¿En Donde Estas?" sung as a duet with Indonesian pop star Agnes Monica.

A DVD version of Esencial was released in late 2012.

In 2016, Chávez appeared on the telenovela Despertar contigo, marking his first telenovela role since Rebelde. In addition, Chavez revealed he was recording new music.

In October 2020, Chávez Participated on the Reality Show of the Spanish Version of “The Masked Singer”, ¿Quién es la máscara? on the 2nd Season as a Black Panther, and was eliminated on the 4th Episode.

In 2020, Chávez appeared on Netflix's Original Serie The House of Flowers as a supporting role character, "Pato Lascurain".

Personal life

Coming out

In March 2007, a magazine published pictures of Chávez signing documents and exchanging rings with another man, allegedly his Canadian boyfriend (later identified as B.J. Murphy), outing Chávez with them. The pictures had been taken in 2005, the year in which same-sex marriages became legal in Canada. There was significant speculation over how the photos were obtained as the ceremony had only included immediate family.

Chávez, who in October 2006 denied rumors of homosexuality, declared in March 2007, in a message posted on RBD's website, that the photos showed a part of him that he had not been willing to discuss previously.

The message, interpreted by many reports as Chavez's official decision to come out of the closet, made international headlines due to Mexico's traditionally conservative roots. Chavez is described as the first high-profile figure in Mexican showbiz to come out.

In an interview with Televisa approximately three months after his coming out, Chávez said the decision allowed him to "begin a healing process in which I left things behind and began many wonderful things."

Legal and personal troubles
In April 2007, People en Español published a report claiming that Chavez and then-husband BJ Murphy maintained a physically abusive relationship, which Chávez denied.

In May 2007, Chávez was arrested for allegedly buying marijuana in New York City. Chavez subsequently apologized.

In 2009, Chávez confirmed he and Murphy were seeking a divorce. The reason for their separation had been the subject of much speculation, but Chávez insisted that their relationship did not end on bad terms: "[Murphy] is a person I love and respect; I also admire him as a professional."

In March 2012, Chávez confirmed he was dating Los Angeles real estate agent Ben Kruger after photos of them together were published in the tabloid TV Notas and later People en Español.

In late April 2013, Chávez, by then broken up with Kruger, was arrested along with Kruger in their Beverly Hills apartment for alleged domestic violence. This followed an incident in February that same year, where Chávez was accused of throwing a cinder block through a skylight at the apartment. Charges related to the late April incident were later dropped due to lack of evidence, as Chávez and Kruger placed blame on each other.

In October 2013, Chávez published multiple pictures on his Twitter account showing his bloodied wrists in what appeared to be a suicide attempt. Chavez reportedly immediately returned to Mexico from Los Angeles to enter a rehabilitation program. On October 10, 2013, Chávez released a video of himself which was uploaded to his YouTube channel, where he explained that he had attempted to commit suicide, and the photos he had uploaded were real.

In the aftermath of the suicide attempt, Latin Times released a letter purportedly written by Kruger, describing what happened that led to his highly publicized arrest with Chávez a few months prior. Among other things, Kruger accused Chávez of numerous instances of lying and infidelity, and also accused members of the media of collusion with Chavez and failing to provide fair coverage. In addition, Kruger claimed that Chavez was still married to Murphy for the duration of Chávez's relationship with Kruger, as Chávez lacked sufficient financial resources to initiate divorce proceedings.

In 2015, Chávez revealed that, shortly after he uploaded the photos, his former bandmate and close friend Anahí rushed to his apartment and "saved his life".

In 2020, Dutch makeup artist Maico Kemper also came forward with domestic violence allegations stating he ended their relationship after a heated argument in which Christian smashed a bottle of tequila over his head and he lost consciousness.  Photos of the injury were released in the media. Christian denied the allegations and accused Kemper of slander.

Awards and recognition
In 2010, Chávez was recognized as one of People en Español's 50 most beautiful.

During the 22nd GLAAD Media Awards in 2011, Chávez received an award for Outstanding Spanish-Language Music Artist for his album Almas Transparentes.

Filmography

Television

Reality show 

Esse Artista Sou Eu performances

Discography

Studio albums
 2010: Almas Transparentes

Extended play (EP)
 2011: Libertad EP
 2012: Esencial EP
 2018: Conectado

Live album
 2012: Esencial

Singles
 2010: ¿En Dónde Estás?
 2010: Almas Transparentes
 2011: Libertad (con Anahí)
 2012: Sacrilégio
 2012: Mas Vale Tarde Que Nunca (con Ana Victoria)

Tours
 2009: Christian Pocket Show
 2010: Libertad World Tour
 2012: Esencial Tour

References

External links

 Official Facebook
 Official YouTube 
 Official Twitter
 

1983 births
American gay musicians
American gay actors
American LGBT singers
Living people
American male pop singers
American male telenovela actors
American male television actors
People from McAllen, Texas
Gay singers
RBD members
Portuguese-language singers of Mexico
Articles containing video clips
American expatriates in Mexico
20th-century American LGBT people
21st-century American LGBT people
LGBT people in Latin music